Jeanne Axelsen  (born 3 January 1968) is a Danish footballer who played as a midfielder for the Denmark women's national football team. She was part of the team at the 1995 FIFA Women's World Cup and 1999 FIFA Women's World Cup.

References

External links
 

1968 births
Living people
Danish women's footballers
Denmark women's international footballers
Place of birth missing (living people)
1999 FIFA Women's World Cup players
Women's association football midfielders
1995 FIFA Women's World Cup players